Contradusta pulchella, common name the pretty cowry or beautiful (little) cowry,  is a species of sea snail, a cowry, a marine gastropod mollusk in the family Cypraeidae, the cowries.

Description
The surface of the pear-shaped shells is smooth and shiny, their basic color is usually whitish or yellowish, with many small beige spots, two longitudinal irregular dark brown stain-like patches and one or two light brown transversal bands, but their pattern is very variable. The base and the margins are whitish with brown spots, while the teeth are dark brown. In the living cowries the mantle is clear, with long sensorial papillae. Mantle and foot are well developed, with external antennae. The lateral flaps of the mantle may completely hide the shell surface and can be quickly retracted into the shell opening. Contradusta pulchella is quite similar to Erronea pyriformis.

Distribution
This species occurs in the sea on the coasts of Japan, East China, Vietnam, Thailand, Philippines and New Guinea. Contradusta pulchella var. pericalles occurs in the Gulf of Oman.

Habitat

Subspecies
 Contradusta pulchella pulchella (Swainson, W.A., 1823) 
 Contradusta pulchella aliguayensis a (Van Heesvelde & Deprez, 2002) 
 Contradusta pulchella pericalles (Melvill & Standen, 1904 
 Contradusta pulchella novaebritanniae  Schilder & Schilder 1937

References
 Lorenz F. & Hubert A. (2000) A guide to worldwide cowries. Edition 2. Hackenheim: Conchbooks. 584 pp

External links
 Biolib
 
 Checklist of Cypraeidae
 Poppe-images
 Cypraea

Cypraeidae
Gastropods described in 1823